Alopex may refer to:

 Alopex lagopus, a taxonomic synonym for the Arctic fox, Vulpes lagopus
 ALOPEX a correlation-based machine learning algorithm
 Alopex (Teenage Mutant Ninja Turtles), a character in the Teenage Mutant Ninja Turtles franchise
 Alopex ancient Greek for fox